Natural bridge or Natural Bridge may refer to:

 Natural arch, a land formation sometimes referred to as a natural bridge

Places

Australia 
 Natural Bridge, Queensland, in the Gold Coast hinterland

United States 
 Natural Bridge, Alabama
 Natural Bridge, New York
 Natural Bridge, Virginia
 Natural Bridge (Virginia), a National Historic Landmark
 Natural Bridge Caverns, in Texas
 Natural Bridge State Park (Massachusetts)
 Natural Bridge State Park (Virginia)
 Natural Bridge State Park (Wisconsin)
 Natural Bridge State Resort Park, in Kentucky
 Natural Bridges National Monument, in Utah
 Natural Bridges State Beach, in Santa Cruz, California
 Ayres Natural Bridge State Park, in Wyoming
 Battle of Natural Bridge, an American Civil War battle in Florida
 Natural Bridge Battlefield State Historic Site at the site of the battle
 Tonto Natural Bridge, in Arizona
 Tonto Natural Bridge State Park
 Natural Bridge Avenue, a major thoroughfare that borders Fairground Park in St. Louis, Missouri

Other uses 
 Natural Bridge (album), by Béla Fleck, 1982
 The Natural Bridge, an album by Silver Jews, 1996
 Natural Bridge (magazine), a literary magazine based at the University of Missouri-St. Louis

See also 
 Arch Creek, Florida, site of a natural bridge that collapsed in 1973
 Bridge of the Gods (geologic event), a semi-mythical natural bridge on the Columbia River